Sancy or Sancy-lès-Meaux (literally Sancy near Meaux) is a commune in the Seine-et-Marne department in the Île-de-France region in north-central France.

Demographics
Inhabitants of Sancy-lès-Meaux are called Sancéens.

See also
Communes of the Seine-et-Marne department

References

Communes of Seine-et-Marne